The women's hammer throw at the 2022 World Athletics U20 Championships was held at Estadio Olímpico Pascual Guerrero on 3 and 5 August 2022.

Records

Results

Qualification
The qualification round took place on 3 August, in two groups, with Group A starting at 09:11 and Group B starting at 10:30. Athletes attaining a mark of at least 62.00 metres ( Q ) or at least the 12 best performers ( q ) qualified for the final.

Final
The final was held on 3 August at 15:11.

References

hammer throw
Hammer throw at the World Athletics U20 Championships